"Kiss" is a song composed, written, and produced by American musician Prince. Released by the Paisley Park label as the lead single from Prince and the Revolution's eighth studio album, Parade (1986), on February 5, 1986, it was a No. 1 hit worldwide, holding the top spot of the US Billboard Hot 100 chart for two weeks. The single was certified gold in 1986 for shipments of 1,000,000 copies by RIAA.

The song is ranked at No. 85 on the Rolling Stone list of the 500 Greatest Songs of All Time in 2021, No. 464 in 2010, and No. 461 in 2004. NME ranked the song at No. 4 in their list of The 150 Greatest Singles of All Time, and voted "Kiss" the best single of 1986.

Following Prince's death in April 2016, the song re-charted on the Billboard Hot 100 at No. 28 and jumped to No. 23 a week later. The song also reached No. 2 on the French Singles Chart. As of April 30, 2016, it had sold 1.33 million digital copies in the U.S.

Age of Chance and Art of Noise also released versions of the song that were critical and chart successes.

Development, production and release
"Kiss" started as a rough acoustic demo, with a verse and chorus written by Prince. He gave his demo to the funk band Mazarati (who approached him in the first place for an extra song for their debut album), and they worked on it with producer David Z at Sunset Sound Studio 2, while Prince was busy working in the studio next to them, Studio 3. Z recalls having one of the band members play a piano part inspired by Bo Diddley's song "Say Man". In the Sound On Sound article for "Kiss", he recalled programming the song's beat on a LinnDrum drum machine, but the Mixonline article he refers to a Linn 9000. However, it's unlikely either of them were used as the drums sound more like the LM-1, Prince's usual drum machine. In the end, Prince decided to finish the song, retaining David Z's unique, funky rhythm and background vocal arrangements by Mazarati's Bruce DeShazer And Marvin Gunn (David Z recounts how the band had expected a song writing credit, and were "pissed" when it did not materialise); he removed the bass line, and added signature guitar and falsetto vocal. For the distinctive "ah-wah-ah" backing vocals, David Z adapted vocals by Brenda Lee - one of the biggest US chart toppers in the Sixties -  from her 1959/1960 hit "Sweet Nothin's", a single from her eponymous album. To make up for the absence of bass, the kick drum was run through an AMS RMX-16 reverb on the non-linear setting. The underlying "keyboard chop" in the background is in fact an acoustic guitar (played by David Z.) run through a Kepex noise gate triggered by the hi-hat track on the multitrack tape - this effect, however, was rather difficult to recreate live on keyboards. The final, minimalist song was a hard sell to Warner Bros., but upon Prince's insistence the song was released and added to Parade.

Despite Warner Bros. not wanting to release it as a single, "Kiss" became Prince's third number-one US hit following 1984's highly successful "When Doves Cry" and "Let's Go Crazy". It was also a big hit across the Atlantic, reaching number 6 on the UK Singles Chart. The song won Prince another 29th Annual Grammy Awards for Grammy Award for Best R&B Performance by a Duo or Group with Vocals, and was nominated for Grammy Award for Best R&B Song. The song became a staple at Prince's concerts and was usually sung partially by the audience.

The 12-inch single of the song is an extension of the album track. The extended section is based on the funky guitar line and contains much fuller instrumentation than the main track, including bass guitar, organ and horns. New lyrics are present from Prince, along with Jill Jones, that end with a humorous dialogue between a wife and her husband watching Prince on television. The B-side of "Kiss" was "♥ or $" ("Love or Money"), sung in a processed, higher-pitched vocal, which Prince would later use for his Camille material. The song relates to the theme in Under the Cherry Moon, and a bit of the song was heard in the film, as was a bit of the extended version of "Kiss". The extended "Kiss" was included on 2006's Ultimate; "♥ or $" was recently re-released as a digital B-side on iTunes.

Revolution bassist Brownmark claims to have co-written the song with Prince: he most likely wrote the second verse as the first verse was on the demo Prince provided himself and Mazarati with to work from. Despite being promised a songwriting credit by Prince, he never got any proper credit and didn't receive any royalties from it.

Composition
The song is written in the key of A major and has a tempo of 112 beats per minute in common time.

Critical reception
Robert Hilburn from Los Angeles Times wrote, "The single combines an ever-so-cool update of a classic James Brown guitar-accented funk riff with witty lyrics that suggest a bit more humility in Prince's sexually aggressive posture. You don't have to be rich to be my girl, he advises. You don't have to be cool to rule my world. Even the put-downs are tinged with humor: Act your age, not your shoe size, he tells one prospective lover."

Music video
The accompanying music video for "Kiss" was directed by Rebecca Blake. In the plot of the video, Prince appears in a half shirt and leather jacket and then all shirtless and performs dance choreography in a hall. The trousers he wears are strip-off pants. He is accompanied by the veiled dancer Monique Mannen wearing black lingerie and sunglasses while Revolution member Wendy Melvoin sits playing guitar.

Legacy
"Kiss" is widely considered one of Prince's finest songs. In 2016, Paste ranked the song number two on their list of the 50 greatest Prince songs, and in 2022, American Songwriter ranked the song number three on their list of the 10 greatest Prince songs.

In 2022, it was included in the list "The story of NME in 70 (mostly) seminal songs", at number 28: Mark Beaumont wrote that with this song, "Prince took his crown while the Hip-Hop Wars raged".

Track listings
 7-inch single
 "Kiss" – 3:46
 "♥ or $" – 3:57

 12-inch single
 "Kiss" (extended version) – 7:16
 "♥ or $" (extended version) – 6:50

 CD single
 "Kiss" (extended version) – 7:16
 "Girls & Boys" – 5:30
 "Under the Cherry Moon" – 2:57

 Digital download
 "Kiss" (Daft Punk Remix) — 4:49

Personnel
 Prince – lead vocals and various instruments
 Mazarati – backing vocals
 Craig Powell – guitar
  Bruce DeShazer (AKA Tony Christian) – guitar, keyboards, backing vocals
 Marr Star – keyboards, backing vocals
 Aaron Keith – keyboards
 Kevin Patrick – Drums
 Terry Casey – Vocals
 Jerome Cox – Bass

Charts and certifications

Weekly charts

Year-end charts

All-time charts

Certifications

Age of Chance version

In 1988, British synthpop group the Art of Noise released a cover of the song, featuring Welsh singer Tom Jones on vocals. Jones had added the song to his Vegas live show and the Art of Noise contacted him after seeing him perform it on TV.

The song became the band's biggest hit to that point, reaching No. 5 on the UK Singles Chart (higher than the original in that country), top 10 in several countries and No. 18 on the US dance chart. It was also No. 1 in New Zealand and Spain.

The song alternates between two distinct rhythms: a fast-paced  rock beat, panned entirely to the left channel; and a half-speed quiet storm-inspired percussion section. The guitar and horns break in the middle of the track musically references the themes to Dragnet and Peter Gunn (two songs the Art of Noise covered with much commercial success) as well as their own breakthrough hit, "Close (to the Edit)" and "Paranoimia", their 1986 collaboration with Max Headroom.  Jones changes the lyric line of "Women, Not Girls rule my world" to "Women and Girls, rule my world."

This version was later included as part of an episode of the series Listed on MuchMoreMusic, which was on the Top 20 cover songs. It can also be heard during the main title sequence of the movie My Stepmother Is an Alien as well as a scene in Kids in the Hall: Brain Candy.

Track listings
 7-inch single
 "Kiss" – 3:30
 "E.F.L." (The Art of Noise) – 5:15

 12-inch single
 "Kiss" (The Battery Mix) – 8:17
 "Kiss" (7-inch version) – 3:30
 "E.F.L." – 5:15

 CD single
 "Kiss" (7-inch version) – 3:30
 "E.F.L." (The Art of Noise) – 5:15
 "Kiss" (The Battery Mix) – 8:17

Charts

Weekly charts

Year-end charts

Other covers
The song had 46 covers ranging from Pop (Kelly Clarkson) to Soul (Howard Tate) and Jazz (Max Raabe).

References

Notes
 Uptown: The Vault – The Definitive Guide to the Musical World of Prince: Nilsen Publishing 2004,

External links
  (official EMI Music channel)
  (official Tom Jones channel)
 The original demo, with Mazarati's vocals can be heard at the group's official MySpace
 Breakdown of the recording process, told by David Z, co-producer of the song

Songs about kissing
1986 singles
1986 songs
1988 singles
Art of Noise songs
Billboard Hot 100 number-one singles
Cashbox number-one singles
Funk songs
Number-one singles in New Zealand
Number-one singles in Spain
Paisley Park Records singles
Polydor Records singles
Prince (musician) songs
Song recordings produced by Prince (musician)
Songs written by Prince (musician)
Tom Jones (singer) songs
Warner Records singles
Virgin Records singles